Boudh District is an administrative and a municipal district, one of the thirty in the Odisha, India. The district headquarters of the Boudh District is the city of Boudh.

History

The early history of Boudh is uncertain. The discovery of Buddhist artifacts from Boudh has led historians to believe that Boudh was an important center of Buddhism. There are inscriptions that indicate that in the middle of the 8th century CE Boudh region was a part of Khinjali Mandala and it  was under the rule of the Bhanja rulers.

The earliest known ruler of this Bhanja dynasty was Nettabhanja who was the independent ruler of the Dhenkanal region . But his successors migrated towards Boudh-Sonepur region and founded Khinjali Mandala . They ruled there as the feudatory of the Bhauma-Karas of Tosali. The name Khinjali Mandala appears for first time in Sonepur Copper Plate grant of Satrubhanja Dev.Satrubhanja Dev was son of Silabhanja Dev and this  indicates that Silabhanja Dev founded the Bhanja dynasty at Khinjali Mandala. Dhirtipura was the capital of Khinjali Mandala; this has been identified to be present day Boudh town.

Janmeyjaya I (also known as Mahabhabagupta), the Somavamsi ruler of South Kosala defeated and killed Ranabhanja Dev, son of Satrubhanja Dev, a ruler of Bhanja family . The Bhanja's were forced out of the Boudh region and renamed it to Odra Desa.

Yayati I was the son Janmejaya I and succeeded him in the throne. He established his capital in Odra-desa at a place called Yayatinagara. This has been identified to be the present day town of Jagati in Boudh District. The Somavansi rulers consequently occupied and migrated towards Utkala leaving South-Kosala in charge of representatives. Kosala was lost to them subsequently and was occupied by the Chodas and the Kalachuris from south. The Ganga dynasty fought a protracted war with the Kalachuris for nearly a century for the control of Kosala territory. It is inferred from the Chatesvar Inscription (1220 CE) that the war finally ended in favour of the Gangas during the reign of Anangabhima Deva III. Thereafter, Boudh came under the rule of Ganga dynasty along with Sonepur and it was ruled by the Ganga Administrators.

Over the years a Brahmin family of the Ganga administrators became quasi-independent and ruled over this territory. Gandhamardan Dev was the last Brahmin ruler of this family. He lacked any natural born successors, and hence adopted Ananga Bhanja of Bhanja royal family Keonjhar State. He adopted the Dev surname of his adoptive parents . Subsequently, became the ruler after Gandharmardhan Dev as Ananga Dev. This laid the foundation of the Bhanja dynasty in Boudh in early 14th century CE. This dynasty continued to rule over this area till 1948 when the state of  acceded to merge with the Orissa Province after British withdrawal from India . Their kingdom comprised modern day Boudh, Athmallik,  and Sonepur areas with its capital headquarters at Swarnapura (Sonepur).  The capital was moved to Boudh due to the friction with the Chouhan rulers of Patna (Patnagarh in Bolangir District).

Boudh was a very powerful kingdom during the first half of the 17th century CE. The territory of Sonepur remained under its direct administration. During this period the Chouhan rulers of Sambalpur had already established their supremacy over almost entire Western Orissa. The Chouhan ruler of Sambalpur,  Balabhadradeva (1605-1630 CE)  defeated Siddhabhanja Dev (Siddheswar Dev) of Boudh and forced him to relinquish the Sonepur region. They subsequently made it a separate state in 1640 CE.

In the meantime Orissa was occupied by the Muslims. Details of the relationship between the rulers of Boudh and the Muslim subedars in Cuttack is not known. However Boudh maintained a friendly relation with the emperors of India both during Maratha rule and Mughal/other Muslim rulers. Raja Pratap Dev of Boudh rendered assistance to Mughal troops who were passing through Boudh to Puri. Due to this assistance the title "Swasti Sri Derlakhya Dhumbadhipati Jharkhund Mandaleswar" was conferred upon him. This title was used by the rulers of Boudh till the time of Raja Banamali Deb.

During the region of Sidhabhanja Dev also known as Siddheswar Dev Sonepur region was conquered from Boudh by the Chouhan ruler of Sambalpur. Boudh state has been losing territory to other kingdoms earlier as well.  In 1498-99 CE, the then Raja of Boudh state gifted the territory Dasapalla to his younger brother Narayan Dev. Narayan Dev later asserted his independence from Boudh and made Dasapalla a separate state. In 1599-1600 CE Raja Madan Mohan Dev ceded the territory lying between  Amaimuhan and the Kharang river on the west  as dowry to his daughters who married into the Chouhan royal family of Patna State.  Athmallik and Khondhmal remained as a part of Boudh state for some time.

After the British conquest of Orissa in 1803 CE, Raja Biswambar Dev of Boudh accepted the British sovereignty and entered into a treaty agreement with the British East India Company on 3 March 1804.
After the Third Anglo-Maratha War, British Government permanently occupied Boudh from the Marathas and included this state in the South West Frontier Agency till 1837, when it was brought under the superintendent of Tributary Mahals, Cuttack.

In 1817 CE, Raja Biswambar Dev died and was succeeded by his Son Chandra Sekhar Dev.  In 1821, he received a fresh Sanand from the British Government fixing the annual tribute at Rs. 800/-.  After his death, his son Pitambara Dev ascended the throne in 1839 CE. During his reign, there was an uprising in the Khondmal region of Ganjam District led by Chakra Bisoyi. The cause of uprising was the practice of human sacrifice by the Khond tribe of Ganjam District. Pitambara Dev could not quell this uprising and on 15 February 1855 CE, Khondmal of Ganjam was separated from the Boudh state and was annexed to the British territory. Raja Pitambar Dev remained loyal to the British Government and cooperated with the British administration in eradicating human sacrifice and suppressing  Khondh rebellion in Ghumsur and Khondhmal of the then Ganjam District. Chakra Bisoi of Ganjam District, who had stayed in Boudh State since 1855 and organized the Khondhas, was finally driven out of the state and peace and order was restored.  The British Government recognized his title Raja, by a separate Sanand granted to him in 1875 CE.
The Athmallik state was a part of Boudh state and the chief of Boudh was the Raja of Boudh and Athmallik.  The Chief of Athmallik was called a Zamindar and was addressed as a Samanta.  In 1875, the Chief of Athmallik was officially recognized as a Raja and Athamallik became a separate state in 1894 CE.

Raja Jogindra Dev succeeded his father Raja Pitambar Dev after his death in 1879 . He was progressive ruler. He opened schools and introduced English education in the state. He died in 1913, leaving his minor son Narayan Dev . Hence the Court of Wards and the Dewan took over the running of the affairs of the state . Narayan Dev formally took over after his coronation on 31 March 1925. During Narayan Dev's  reign, the power and function of the ruler was reduced to a considerable extent . It appears that the state was under the de facto  rule of the political agent. Raja Narayan Dev suppressed a political agitation in Boudh in 1930-31 and adopted measures to suppress the Prajamandal Movement in 1945.  He also developed the modern day Jagti village (the historical Yayatinagar, the erstwhile Somavamsi Capital) and renamed it to, Narayan Nagar.  He was the last ruler of the Boudh State and on 1 January 1948, the state merged with the Orissa province.

Both Boudh-Kandhamal was part of Ganjam District for some time and later on Boudh became a sub-division of the newly created District of Boudh-Kandhamal when kamdhamal was separated from Ganjam. On 2 January 1994 it became district headquarters of a separate district called Boudh that was carved out of the Boudh Kandhamal district.

Geography

The district lies in central Odisha towards the south of the Mahanadi River, which forms the western and northern boundary of the district. Across the Mahanadi lay the districts of Bolangir to the west, Subarnapur to the northwest, and Angul to the northeast. Nayagarh District lies to the southeast, Phulbani District to the south, and Kalahandi district to the southwest.

Geographically the Boudh district extends from Latitudes 20°.22’ to 20°.50’N and Longitudes 83°.34’ to 84°.49’E. It is bounded by River Mahanadi and Anugul District to the north, Kandhamal District to the south, Nayagarh District to the east and Tel River and Subarnapur District to the west.

Transport

Boudh is well connected with road and rail with other district headquarters and the state capital Bhubaneswar. The distance of Boudh from Bhubaneswar is 240 km. One can come to Boudh via State Highway No. 1 and 14 (via Nayagarh–Charichhak) or can come by National Highway No. 42. (via Angul). Regular train services are available from Bhubaneswar viz.  Bhubaneswar –Sambalpur Intercity Express, Hirakud Express, Puri-Sambalpur passenger train. To reach Boudh one has to get down at Rairakhol station. From here one has to travel around 27 km. either by bus or taxi to reach Boudh. The nearest airport is at Jharsuguda.

Demographics

According to the 2011 census Boudh district has a population of 441,162, roughly equal to the nation of Malta. This gives it a ranking of 552nd in India (out of a total of 640). Its population growth rate over the decade 2001-2011 was 17.82%. Baudh has a sex ratio of 991 females for every 1000 males, and a literacy rate of 72.51%. Scheduled Castes and Scheduled Tribes make up 23.79% and 12.55% of the population respectively.

Religion 
The majority of the people of the district are Hindus (99.32%) and other religions as minority, including Muslims (0.23%), Christians (0.12%), Sikhs (0.01%) and others (0.33%). As of 2011 census, the Boudh district has the highest percentage of Hindus in India.

Languages 

At the time of the 2011 Census of India, 78.69% of the population in the district spoke Odia and 20.55% Sambalpuri as their first language.

Culture
Boudh is a new district but the civilization of Boudh area is as old as the oldest river valley civilizations of the world. As all civilization started on the banks of the river and the riverine passage was the mode of transport in the days of yore, people of Boudh claimed to be inheritors of rich culture. From 2nd century AD up to a period of one thousand years, Boudh was an important seat of Jagannathism , i.e Odia Vaishnavism, Shaivism and Shakti cult in the country. Boudh is part of Odia Culture. It was highly developed educationally and culturally during the Soma Vanshi period and also during the Gangas and Surya Vanshi period.

Communal dance
Various types of dances are prevalent in the district. These are usually held during socio-religious functions. An account of some of the major dances is given below.

 Karma dance
 Danda Nata
 Dalkhai dance

Fairs and festivals
The Hindus of the district observe a number of festivals all year round.  These festivals may broadly be divided into two categories, viz. domestic festivals observed in each household and public festivals and fairs where people congregate in large numbers on some auspicious days. The domestic festivals are confined to worship of family deities, observance of Ekadashi, various , etc. most of them being guided by phases of the moon. The public festivals are usually religious ceremonies attended by a large number of men, women, and children who come for worship as well as entertainment. An account of some of the important festivals in the district is given below.

 Chuda Khai Jatra
 Ratha Jatra
 Laxmi Puja
 Nuakhai
 Sivaratri
 Dasahara
 Dola Jatra
 Puajiuntia and Bhaijiuntia
 Ramaleela
 Kailashi Jatra

Recreation
Leisure and recreation are essential for life. People usually gather in the evening at the temple or in a common place where the priest or Puran panda recites and explains from the religious texts like the Bhagabat, the Mahabharat, the Ramayan, the Haribansa, or other Puranas. The singing of Bhajan or kirtan accompanied with musical instruments like khanjani, gini, mrudanga or harmonium is also another popular form of entertainment for the people. Occasionally acrobatic feats, monkey dance, beard dance, and snake charming and magic performed by itinerant professional groups also provide entertainment to the people. In urban areas cinema, opera are a common source of entertainment. Besides this recreational clubs are also functioning in the district.

Tourism
Boudh is known for its century-old temples, ancient Buddha statues, and caves. With the spread of Saivism, Vaishnavism and a number of other cults, numerous shrines dedicated to various deities were found in this region.  The notable temples and other tourist attractions includes:

 Buddha Statues
 Ramanath Temple
 Jogindra Villa Palace
 Hanuman Temple
 Chandra Chuda and Matengeswar Temple
 Madan Mohan Temple
 Jagannath Temple
 Debagarh
 Chari Sambhu Temple
 Purunakatak

Places of Interest

 Padmatola Sanctuary
 Dambarugada Mountains
 Nayakpada Cave (Patali Shrikhetra)
 Marjakud Island
Apart from the above places, there are numerous places in Boudh for tourist visits e.g. Asurgada, Shiva temple at Karadi, Sarsara and Baunsuni, Jatasamadhi temple at Balasinga (Temple of Mahima Cult), and Paljhir Dam.

Legislation

Vidhan Sabha Constituencies

The following are the 2 Vidhan sabha constituencies of Boudh district and the elected members of that area are:

Lok Sabha constituency 

The Boudh district comes in the Lok Sabha constituency of Kandhamal and the elected member of that area is:

See also
 Boudh
Kandhamal (Lok Sabha constituency)

References

External links

 

 
1994 establishments in Orissa
Districts of Odisha
States and territories established in 1994